Dr. Lily Hassan is a fictional character from the BBC soap opera Doctors, portrayed by Seeta Indrani, who made her first appearance on 28 October 2008. Her backstory involves going from a rebel in her youth to reinventing herself and achieving a medical career. During her time on Doctors, Lily is depicted as a talented and devoted doctor who "does everything by the book". She struggles with social interacion and does not find it easy to trust people. Lily made her final appearance on 31 March 2010 when she leaves the fictional Mill Health Centre to go on sabbatical leave to take care of the drug-addicted Sapphire Cox (Ami Metcalf). Producers of the soap felt Lily was a successful character since she provided a contrast between herself and other colleagues.

Storylines
Lily arrives at the Mill Health Centre when Heston Carter (Owen Brenman) employs her to ease the workload of his colleagues. From her arrival, it is clear Heston is in love with her. Despite her constant rejection, he perseveres and it is made clear that she has feelings for him too when Lily kisses Heston. Lily becomes well known for keeping a skull which gains her the nickname Morticia amongst colleagues. Lily helps Ruth Pearce (Selina Chilton) to recover from her stay at a psychiatric hospital. After being persuaded by Julia Parsons (Diane Keen), Lily proposes to Heston at the Christmas party after their commitment to foster children together. To her shock, he walks out of the room and later explains that they would not work out in the long-term. Lily leaves the Mill to go on a long-term sabbatical leave after taking on the care of Sapphire Cox (Ami Metcalf), who is addicted to methadone.

Development
On the BBC website, it was noted that Lily was a rebel in her youth but that she managed to reinvent herself by achieving a career in medicine. It also stated that despite being academically talented, she finds social interaction with others difficult, as well as trusting people. Lily is a general practitioner, police surgeon and forensic archaeologist; the BBC website stated that her dedication to her career "borders on the obsessive" and that she "does everything by the book". However, due to her stern personality, she lives a "lonely life of predictability" and secretly hopes that someone will love her for the person she is. Doctors producer Peter Lloyd was asked if Lily would ever return to the series following her exit. He said that a return had never been ruled out since he saw Lily to be "a successful character who provided a great contrast to the others in the gang." However, he felt that the producers had reached a natural end for the character. Lloyd was happy with the ending she had been given as he had planned for her to get a positive ending with Sapphire.

Reception
Indrani was longlisted for Sexiest Female at the 2009 British Soap Awards.

References

External links
 Lily Hassan at BBC Online

Doctors (2000 TV series) characters
Female characters in television
Fictional British medical doctors
Fictional female doctors
Television characters introduced in 2008